Kan-Laon is the name of an ancient Hiligaynon deity. During pre-Hispanic times, the deity was worshiped by indigenous people as their Supreme Ruler. In the Visayan language, Kan-Laon means "One Who Is the Ruler Of Time."

Kanlaon Volcano, is the largest active stratovolcano in the Philippines and highest peak in the Visayas region, specifically Negros, where it is situated. In ancient times, native priests and priestesses (babaylan) would climb up the volcano and do rituals every good harvest season or when there was a special ceremony. They would also offer gifts as a sign of respect. 

Kan-Laon is similar to other mountain anito (spirits) throughout the Philippine archipelago. Similar deities include Gugurang of the Bicolanos, Kabunian of the Ilocanos and Ifugaos, and Apo Sandawa of the Lumad peoples, all of which are also associated with mountains or volcanoes.

References

Visayan deities
Creator goddesses
Time and fate goddesses
Tutelary deities
Filipino goddesses
Culture of Negros Oriental
Culture of Negros Occidental
Volcano goddesses